Magnificent Presence (also known as A Magnificent Haunting) is a 2012 Italian drama film directed by Ferzan Özpetek.

Plot 
Pietro Pontechievello is a gay man who rents a large house in the historic center of Rome. In the abode Pietro quickly learns of strange and mysterious presences. The house is haunted by the ghosts of members of a theater company dating back to the times of fascism, and now they do not know that are dead. Indeed, the ghosts believe they are on leave to participate in a new show, and Pietro does not know how to drive the intruders from the building.

Cast 

 Andrea Bosca - Luca Veroli
 Margherita Buy - Lea Marni
 Loredana Cannata - Casting
 Giuseppe Fiorello - Filippo Verni
 Elio Germano - Pietro Pontechievello
 Paola Minaccioni - Maria
 Ambrogio Maestri - Ambrogio Dardini
 Anna Proclemer - Livia Morosini
 Vittoria Puccini - Beatrice Marni
 Cem Yılmaz - Yusuf Antep

References

External links 

2012 films
2010s fantasy comedy-drama films
Films directed by Ferzan Özpetek
Italian fantasy comedy-drama films
2012 comedy films
2012 drama films
2010s Italian films
Fandango (Italian company) films
Rai Cinema films
2010s Italian-language films